In enzymology, a succinate-semialdehyde dehydrogenase (SSADH) is an enzyme that catalyzes the chemical reaction

succinate semialdehyde + NAD+ + H2O  succinate + NADH + 2 H+

The 3 substrates of this enzyme are succinate semialdehyde, NAD+, and H2O, whereas its 3 products are succinate, NADH, and H+.

This enzyme belongs to the family of oxidoreductases, specifically those acting on the aldehyde or oxo group of donor with NAD+ or NADP+ as acceptor.  The systematic name of this enzyme class is succinate-semialdehyde:NAD+ oxidoreductase. Other names in common use include succinate semialdehyde dehydrogenase, succinic semialdehyde dehydrogenase, succinyl semialdehyde dehydrogenase, and succinate semialdehyde:NAD+ oxidoreductase.  This enzyme participates in glutamate and butyrate metabolism.

Succinate-semialdehyde dehydrogenase is found in organisms ranging across the tree of life from bacteria to humans.  It is important in the degradation of γ-aminobutyric acid in humans, and deficiency of the enzyme causes serious health effects (succinic semialdehyde dehydrogenase deficiency).

In bacteria, the enzyme is also involved in γ-aminobutyric acid degradation, but can be recruited to facilitate other functions, such as converting succinate-semialdehyde formed during fission of the pyridine ring to succinic acid for entry into the Krebs Cycle.

References

Further reading 

 

EC 1.2.1
NADH-dependent enzymes
Enzymes of unknown structure